Moggi is an Italian surname. Notable people with the surname include:

 Eugenio Moggi, Italian professor of computer science
 Luciano Moggi (born 1937), Italian football administrator

Italian-language surnames